John Harper (1809–1842) was an English architect.

Life
Harper was born at Dunkenhalgh Hall, near Blackburn, Lancashire, on 11 November 1809. He studied architecture under Benjamin and Philip Wyatt, and when with them prepared the designs for Apsley House, York House, and the Duke of York's Column.

Harper went into practice as an architect at York. When travelling in Italy to studying art, he caught a malarial fever in Rome. While still in a weak state he went on to Naples, where he died on 18 October 1842. William Etty, David Roberts and Clarkson Stanfield were among his friends.

Works

Harper was employed by the Duke of Devonshire at Bolton Abbey, by Lord Londesborough, and others. Some of his best-known works were St Peter's School, York, the Roman Catholic church at Bury, Lancashire, and Elton church in the same town.

Notes

External links
Victorian Web, John Harper (1809-1842).
Victorian Web, St. Peter's School, Clifton, York.

Attribution

1809 births
1842 deaths
Architects from Lancashire
People from Blackburn
Deaths from malaria
19th-century English architects